Artur Omarov (born 13 August 1988) is a Czech Greco-Roman wrestler. He represented the Czech Republic at the 2020 Summer Olympics in Tokyo, Japan.

He competed at the World Wrestling Championships in 2010, 2011, 2013 – 2015 and 2017 – 2021. He also competed at the European Wrestling Championships in 2013 and 2016 – 2021. In 2015, he competed in the 85 kg event at the European Games held in Baku, Azerbaijan. In 2016, he competed at three qualification tournaments hoping to qualify for the 2016 Summer Olympics in Rio de Janeiro, Brazil.

In March 2021, he competed at the European Qualification Tournament in Budapest, Hungary hoping to qualify for the 2020 Summer Olympics in Tokyo, Japan. He did not qualify at this tournament but, in May 2021, he was able to qualify for the Olympics at the World Olympic Qualification Tournament held in Sofia, Bulgaria. He competed in the men's 97 kg event where he was eliminated in his first match by Alex Szőke of Hungary. In October 2021, he competed in the 97 kg event at the World Wrestling Championships held in Oslo, Norway.

In 2022, he competed in the 97 kg event at the European Wrestling Championships in Budapest, Hungary where he was eliminated in his second match. He competed in the 97kg event at the 2022 World Wrestling Championships held in Belgrade, Serbia.

References

External links 

 

Living people
1988 births
Place of birth missing (living people)
Czech male sport wrestlers
European Games competitors for the Czech Republic
Wrestlers at the 2015 European Games
Wrestlers at the 2020 Summer Olympics
Olympic wrestlers of the Czech Republic
20th-century Czech people
21st-century Czech people